This is a list of fictional characters in the British supernatural comedy drama television series, Being Human. The story follows a vampire, a werewolf, and a ghost as they try to live together in modern-day Britain. Actors Lenora Crichlow, Russell Tovey and Aidan Turner composed the original cast of the program's first three seasons with Sinead Keenan joining the main cast in season 3. The original cast changed minimally in season 4 however the fifth season featured an entirely new werewolf, vampire, and ghost trio played by Michael Socha, Damien Molony, and Kate Bracken.

Main characters

Supporting characters

Pilot

Recurring characters

Secondary characters

Series 1

Recurring characters

Secondary characters

Series 2

Recurring characters

Secondary characters

Series 3

Recurring characters

Secondary characters

Series 4

Recurring characters

Secondary characters

Series 5

Recurring characters

Secondary characters

References

External links
 

 
Being Human
Being Human